Arthur E. Seabury (1878–1953) was a British trade unionist and politician.

Career 
Seabury lived in Warrington and became prominent in the British Socialist Party.  In 1916, he chaired the party's conference. The party later affiliated to the Labour Party, and Seabury was elected to the council, serving until 1934.

Seabury began working full-time for the National Union of General Workers in 1919, as a district officer.  He retained the post when the union became part of the new National Union of General and Municipal Workers (NUGMW), and in 1934 was appointed as the union's Lancashire District Secretary.  He retired in 1943, and died ten years later.

References

1878 births
1953 deaths
British Socialist Party members
Councillors in Cheshire
Trade unionists from Cheshire
Labour Party (UK) councillors
People from Warrington